The Limpopo false shieldback (Acilacris obovatus) is a tettigoniid orthopteran that is endemic to Limpopo and Mpumalanga, South Africa.

References

Tettigoniidae
Insects described in 1996
Endemic insects of South Africa